The 1956 Open Championship was the 85th Open Championship, held 4–6 July at Royal Liverpool Golf Club in Hoylake, England. Two-time defending champion Peter Thomson of Australia won his third consecutive Open, three strokes ahead of runner-up Flory Van Donck of Belgium. It was the third of five Open titles for the 26-year-old Thomson.

Qualifying took place on 2–3 July. Entries played 18 holes on the Championship course and 18 holes at Wallasey. With a record 360 entries it was decided that, for the first time, qualifying would be in groups of three rather than the usual two. The number of qualifiers was limited to a maximum of 100. Ties for 100th place would not qualify. The qualifying score was 152 and 96 players qualified. Gary Player and Peter Thomson led the qualifiers on 140. The maximum number of players making the cut after 36 holes was set at 50. Ties for 50th place did not make the cut. Prize money was unchanged with £1,000 for the winner out of a total purse of £3,750.

Past champions in the field

Made the cut

Missed the cut

Round summaries

First round
Wednesday, 4 July 1956

Second round
Thursday, 5 July 1956

Amateurs: Carr (+8), Sharp (+12), Jones (+12), Tate (+14), Shepperson (+17), Thirlwell (+18), Fogarty (+21).

Third round
Friday, 6 July 1956 - (morning)

Final round
Friday, 6 July 1956 - (afternoon)

Amateur: Carr (+22).

References

External links
Royal Liverpool 1956 (Official site)

The Open Championship
Golf tournaments in England
Sport in the Metropolitan Borough of Wirral
Open Championship
Open Championship
Open Championship